Celia Jiménez may refer to:

Celia Jiménez (footballer) (born 1995), Spanish footballer
Celia Jiménez (chef) (born 1976), Spanish chef